Nicholas McKay is the name of:

 Nicholas McKay (actor), Australian actor on the television series Farscape
 Nicholas McKay (inventor) (1920–2014), American inventor and entrepreneur